(554 – 15 April 628) was the 33rd monarch of Japan, according to the traditional order of succession.

Suiko reigned from 593 until her death in 628.

In the history of Japan, Suiko was the first of eight women to take on the role of empress regnant. The seven female sovereigns reigning after Suiko were Kōgyoku/Saimei, Jitō, Genmei, Genshō, Kōken/Shōtoku, Meishō and Go-Sakuramachi.

Traditional narrative
Before her ascension to the Chrysanthemum Throne, her personal name (her imina) was Mikekashiya-hime-no-mikoto, also called Toyomike Kashikiya hime no Mikoto.

Empress Suiko had several names including Princess Nukatabe and (possibly posthumous) Toyomike Kashikiya. She was a daughter of Emperor Sushun. Her mother was Soga no Iname's daughter, Soga no Kitashihime. Suiko was the younger sister of Emperor Yōmei.

Life

Empress Suiko was a consort to her half-brother, Emperor Bidatsu, but after Bidatsu's first wife died she became his official consort and was given the title Ōkisaki (official consort of the emperor). She bore eight children.

After Bidatsu's death, Suiko's brother, Emperor Yōmei, came to power for about two years before dying of illness. Upon Yōmei's death, another power struggle arose between the Soga clan and the Mononobe clan, with the Sogas supporting Prince Hatsusebe and the Mononobes supporting Prince Anahobe. The Sogas prevailed once again and Prince Hatsusebe acceded to the throne as Emperor Sushun in 587. When asked to accede to the throne to fill the power vacuum that subsequently developed, Suiko became the first of what would be several examples in Japanese history where a woman was chosen to accede to the throne to avert a power struggle.

 593 : In the 2nd year of Sushun-tennōs reign (崇峻天皇二年), he died; and contemporary scholars then construed that the succession (senso) was received by the consort of former Emperor Bidatsu.  Shortly thereafter, Empress Suiko is said to have ascended to the throne (sokui).

Suiko's contemporary title would not have been tennō, as most historians believe this title was not introduced until the reigns of Emperor Tenmu and Empress Jitō. Rather, it was presumably Sumeramikoto or Amenoshita Shiroshimesu Ōkimi (治天下大王), meaning "the great Queen who rules all under heaven". Alternatively, Suiko might have been referred to as (ヤマト大王/大君) or the "Great Queen of Yamato".

Prince Shōtoku was appointed regent the following year. Although political power during Suiko's reign is widely viewed as having been wielded by Prince Shōtoku and Soga no Umako, Suiko was far from powerless. The mere fact that she survived and her reign endured suggests she had significant political skills.

In 599, an earthquake destroyed buildings throughout Yamato Province in what is now Nara Prefecture.

Suiko's refusal to grant Soga no Umako's request that he be granted the imperial territory known as Kazuraki no Agata in 624 is cited as evidence of her independence from his influence. Some of the many achievements under Empress Suiko's reign include the official recognition of Buddhism by the issuance of the Flourishing Three Treasures Edict in 594. Suiko was also one of the first Buddhist monarchs in Japan and had taken the vows of a nun shortly before becoming empress.

The reign of this empress was marked by the opening of relations with the Sui court in 600, the adoption of the Twelve Level Cap and Rank System in 603 and the adoption of the Seventeen-article constitution in 604.

The adoption of the Sexagenary cycle calendar (Jikkan Jūnishi) in Japan is attributed to Empress Suiko in 604.

At a time when imperial succession was generally determined by clan leaders, rather than the emperor, Suiko left only vague indications of succession to two candidates while on her deathbed. One, Prince Tamura, was a grandson of Emperor Bidatsu and was supported by the main line of Sogas, including Soga no Emishi. The other, Prince Yamashiro, was a son of Prince Shōtoku and had the support of some lesser members of the Soga clan. After a brief struggle within the Soga clan in which one of Prince Yamashiro's main supporters was killed, Prince Tamura was chosen and he acceded to the throne as Emperor Jomei in 629.

Empress Suiko ruled for 35 years. Although there were seven other reigning empresses, their successors were most often selected from amongst the males of the paternal Imperial bloodline, which is why some conservative scholars argue that the women's reigns were temporary and that male-only succession tradition must be maintained in the 21st century. Empress Genmei, who was followed on the throne by her daughter, Empress Genshō, remains the sole exception to this conventional argument.

The actual site of Suiko's grave is known. This empress is traditionally venerated at a memorial Shinto shrine (misasagi) at Osaka.

The Imperial Household Agency designates this location as Suiko's mausoleum.  It's formally named Shinaga no Yamada no misasagi.

Spouse and children

Empress Suiko, born as Princess Nukatabe (額田部皇女), was the daughter of Emperor Kinmei and his consort (Hi), Soga no Kitashihime.Princess Nukatabe had five full sisters and seven full brothers among which the eldest would become Emperor Yomei.

She married her eldest half-brother, Prince Nunakura Futotama-Shiki, born by her father's legal wife and empress consort. The couple had eight children but none would ascend the throne
 Husband: Prince Nunakakura no Futo Tamashiki no Sumeramikoto (渟中倉太珠敷) later Emperor Bidatsu, Emperor Kinmei's 
 First Daughter: Princess Uji no Shitsukahi/Uji no Kahitako (菟道貝蛸皇女, b.570), married to Crown Prince Shotoku
 First Son: Prince Takeda (竹田皇子)
 Second Daughter: Princess Woharida (小墾田皇, b.572), married to Prince Oshisako-no-Hikohito-no-Oe
 Third Daughter: Princess Umori/Karu no Mori (鸕鶿守皇女)
 Second Son: Prince Wohari (葛城王)
 Third Son: Prince Owari (尾張皇子), Father of Tachibana-no-Oiratsume (Crown Prince Shotoku's consort)
 Fourth Daughter: Princess Tame (田眼皇女), married to Emperor Jomei
 Fifth Daughter: Princess Sakurawi no Yumihari (桜井弓張皇女), married to Prince Oshisako-no-Hikohito-no-Oe, later married to Prince Kume (Emperor Yomei's son)

Ancestry

See also
 Empress Jingū, semi-legendary, rule preceded Empress Suiko
 Empress of Japan
 Emperor of Japan
 List of emperors of Japan
 Imperial cult
 Suiko period

Notes

References
 Aston, William George. (1896). Nihongi: Chronicles of Japan from the Earliest Times to A.D. 697. London: Kegan Paul, Trench, Trubner. 
 Brown, Delmer M. and Ichirō Ishida, eds. (1979). Gukanshō: The Future and the Past. Berkeley: University of California Press. ; 
 Hammer, Joshua. (2006). Yokohama Burning: The Deadly 1923 Earthquake and Fire that Helped Forge the Path to World War II. New York: Simon & Schuster. 
 Nussbaum, Louis-Frédéric and Käthe Roth. (2005). Japan encyclopedia. Cambridge: Harvard University Press. ; 
 Ponsonby-Fane, Richard Arthur Brabazon. (1959). The Imperial House of Japan. Kyoto: Ponsonby Memorial Society. 
 Titsingh, Isaac. (1834). Nihon Ōdai Ichiran; ou, Annales des empereurs du Japon.  Paris: Royal Asiatic Society, Oriental Translation Fund of Great Britain and Ireland. 
 Varley, H. Paul. (1980). A Chronicle of Gods and Sovereigns: Jinnō Shōtōki of Kitabatake Chikafusa. New York: Columbia University Press. ; 

 
 

 Women rulers in Japan
Japanese monarchs
554 births
628 deaths
Japanese empresses regnant
People of Asuka-period Japan
Asuka period Buddhist nuns
6th-century monarchs in Asia
7th-century monarchs in Asia
6th-century women rulers
7th-century women rulers
6th-century Japanese monarchs
7th-century Japanese monarchs
7th-century Japanese women
6th-century Japanese women
Japanese Buddhist nuns
6th-century Buddhist nuns
7th-century Buddhist nuns
Japanese Buddhist monarchs
Japanese princesses
Daughters of emperors